Joseph Dwain Deshotel (born December 3, 1951) is an American attorney, politician, and businessman who served as a member of the Texas House of Representatives from the 22nd district between 1999 and 2023.

Background 
Deshotel was born and raised in Beaumont, Texas and attended Monsignor Kelly Catholic High School. Deshotel received his bachelor's degree in political science from Lamar University in 1974 and a Juris Doctor from Thurgood Marshall School of Law at Texas Southern University in 1978.

Career 
Deshotel has been an attorney, businessman, and Technical Sergeant in the United States Air Force Reserves.

Deshotel was elected to the Texas House of Representatives after he ran unopposed in 1998. He has run unopposed in each election since, except in 2004, 2006, and 2008, when he faced Libertarian opponents. However, he faced no significant threat, as he received the vast majority of the votes each year.

He was one of only three members in his 25-member freshman class to receive the Rising Star Award.

In 2015, he served as the chair of the Land and Resource Management committee. He has also served on the Special Committee on Redistricting. As of 2017, he is Chair of the Select Committee on Texas Ports, Innovation & Infrastructure and a member of the Public Education Committee and the Economic & Small Business Development Committee.

He has previously served on several committees, including the House Appropriations, House Economic Development, Transportation, and Redistricting committees. He was also the chairman of Budget Oversight for the House Elections Committee and the vice chair of the Local & Consent Calendars.

Personal life 
Deshotel has one son.

References

External links 
 
 Texas House of Representatives Official Page

1951 births
People from Beaumont, Texas
Democratic Party members of the Texas House of Representatives
Living people
Lamar University alumni
Thurgood Marshall School of Law alumni
United States Air Force airmen
African-American state legislators in Texas
21st-century American politicians
United States Air Force reservists
21st-century African-American politicians
20th-century African-American people